Abdel Aziz El-Shafei (born 8 December 1931) is an Egyptian former swimmer. He competed in the men's 100 metre freestyle at the 1952 Summer Olympics He also competed in the water polo tournaments at the 1952 and 1960 Summer Olympics.

References

External links
 

1931 births
Living people
Egyptian male swimmers
Egyptian male water polo players
Olympic swimmers of Egypt
Olympic water polo players of Egypt
Swimmers at the 1952 Summer Olympics
Water polo players at the 1952 Summer Olympics
Water polo players at the 1960 Summer Olympics
Sportspeople from Cairo
Swimmers at the 1955 Mediterranean Games
20th-century Egyptian people